Danny Gilmore (born December 23, 1973) is a Canadian actor, who is best known for his role as Vallier in John Greyson's Lilies (1996), for which he received a Genie Award nomination for Best Actor at the 17th Genie Awards. He has also appeared in the films Gaz Bar Blues, Ice Cream, Chocolate and Other Consolations (Crème glacée, chocolat et autres consolations), Les Fils de Marie, Days of Darkness (L'Âge des ténèbres), Maria Chapdelaine  and the French–Canadian TV movie Marie-Antoinette.

Gilmore wrote, produced and directed the independent film Bonzaïon in 2004. He was also named as one of ten directors to watch by the Canadian media journal Playback in 2005.

Filmography

Film

Television

References

External links 

1973 births
Living people
Canadian male film actors